Energit is a Czech jazz fusion band from Prague founded in 1973 by guitarist Luboš Andršt, singer Ivan Khunt, drummer Jaroslav Erno Šedivý, and bassist Vladimír Padrůněk. The band's first lineup was short-lived, as that year, Šedivý and Khunt emigrated. In the mid 1970s, their sound was strongly influenced by fusion bands such as the Mahavishnu Orchestra, while also incorporating a horn section. Over the following years, the band featured a number of other musicians, including well-known Czech fusion and rock musicians such as singer Vladimír Mišík, drummer Anatoli Kohout, and pianist Emil Viklický, before disbanding in 1980. In the 2000s, Energit regrouped for live performances under the name Energit Luboše Andršta, with Andršt on electric guitar (until his death in 2021), drummer Jiří Zelenka, bassist Vladimír Guma Kulhánek, and keyboardist/singer Jan Holeček.

Discography
Studio albums
 Energit (1975)
 Piknik (1978)
 Time's Arrow (2017)

EPs
 Mini Jazz Klub 6 (1976)
 Jazzrockova Dílna 2 (1977)

References

External links

 
 

Czech jazz-rock groups
Musical groups from Prague
Musical groups established in 1973
Musical groups disestablished in 1980